Jayme Torrens (1741-1803) was a Spanish composer who was maestro de capilla at Málaga Cathedral after Juan Francés de Iribarren.

Recorded works
"Serpiente venenosa" Maria Espada, David Sagastume, Orquestra Barroca de Sevilla  Diego Fasolis, Almaviva 2006
"Guiados de una estrella", "O Adalid invencible", "Soberano Señor"   Maria Espada, José Hernández-pastor, Orquestra Barroca de Sevilla, Fasolis, Prometeo 2008

References

1741 births
1803 deaths